Lochinver (Loch an Inbhir in Gaelic) is a village that is located at the head of the sea loch Loch Inver, on the coast in the Assynt district of Sutherland, Highland, Scotland. A few miles northeast is Loch Assynt which is the source of the River Inver which flows into Loch Inver at the village. There are 200 or so lochans in the area which makes the place very popular with anglers. Lochinver is dominated by the "sugar loaf" shape of Caisteal Liath, the summit peak of nearby Suilven.

Fishing port
Lochinver is an important fishing port in Scotland; frequented by European fishermen primarily from Spain and France. Lochinver underwent a major renewal project in the 1990s where the harbour area was rebuilt and a new and much improved loading area was created. This new development involved blasting an area of several hectares out of the surrounding rock.  At present the area is mostly undeveloped, with the exception of a new Sports Centre.

In 2020, Lochinver was the fourth largest whitefish (demersal) port, with over £14 million of fish and shellfish passing through the port (of which £1.6 million was landed by Scottish vessels).

The back of Lochinver is a beautiful part of Assynt with local tourism and nature areas being developed in conjunction with small-scale forestry activities. Birdlife in Lochinver includes the curlew, oystercatcher and hooded crow.

Local villages
Other local villages include Inverkirkaig, accessed by the road leading up the River Culag, and on the coastal road north: Achmelvich, Clachtoll, Clashmore, Stoer, Clashnessie, Drumbeg and Culkein Drumbeg.

Proposed railway link
In the 1890s, it was suggested that a railway be constructed from Invershin to Lochinver, to 'open up' the Highlands and provide a direct rail connection with ferries to the Western Isles. This scheme was as an alternative to a proposed route to Ullapool from Garve. In the event, neither were able to obtain funding.

Other places named Lochinver
The Lochinver name was adopted in the 1950s by a large sheep station in New Zealand's North Island.

Lochinver in film
 1973 The Highlands and Islands - A Royal Tour, a documentary about Prince Charles' visit to the Highlands and Islands, directed by Oscar Marzaroli.
 2017 Edie, a film about a widowed pensioner who climbs Suilven , directed by Simon Hunter.

Gallery

References

External links

History of Lochinver
Lochinver Station NZ

Populated places in Sutherland
Ports and harbours of Scotland
Fishing communities in Scotland
Fishing communities